Bellérophon is an opera with music by Jean-Baptiste Lully and a libretto by Thomas Corneille and Bernard le Bovier de Fontenelle first performed by the Opéra at the Théâtre du Palais-Royal in Paris on 31 January 1679.

The libretto is based on Hesiod's Theogony. The opera played for nine months and was one of Lully's greatest successes.

Roles

Synopsis
The queen Sténobée (soprano), spurned by Bellérophon (tenor) who loves the princess Philonoé (soprano), has the magician Amisodar (bass) turn the garden into a barren desert and summon a chimera which terrorizes the country of Lycia. Apollo (tenor) appears and all is solved.

Modern performances
The first performance in modern times was by Les Talens Lyriques conducted by Christophe Rousset at the Festival of Beaune, 24 July 2010. It was followed by a two performances in Paris, the first of which was recorded and released in 2011 by the record label Aparté.

Recording
Bellérophon Cyril Auvity, Ingrid Perruche, Céline Scheen, Les Talens Lyriques, conducted by Christophe Rousset (Aparté, 2 CDs, 2011)

Sources

The New Grove French Baroque Masters, ed. Graham Sadler (Macmillan, 1986)
The Viking Opera Guide ed. Holden (Viking, 1993)
Le magazine de l'opéra baroque by Jean-Claude Brenac (in French)

External links 
 

Operas by Jean-Baptiste Lully
French-language operas
Operas
1679 operas
Operas based on classical mythology
Opera world premieres at the Paris Opera
Adaptations of works by Hesiod